Leonard Farbstein (October 12, 1902 – November 9, 1993) was an American lawyer and politician who served seven terms as a U.S. Representative from New York from 1957 to 1971.

Early life and career
Farbstein was born on October 12, 1902, in New York City to Louis and Yetta (Schlanger) Farbstein. His father, Louis, was a Jewish immigrant from Russia-Poland and worked as a tailor.

During Farbstein's childhood, he sold newspapers and handkerchiefs after school. In the World War I era, Farbstein as a teenager, served in the United States Coast Guard Reserve.

At war's end, he graduated from High School of Commerce in New York and worked at the Audubon Society during those years. He attended City College of New York and Hebrew Union Teachers College. He received an LL.B. from the New York University School of Law in 1924, and practiced law in New York City.

Political career

State legislature 
Farbstein ran for the New York State Assembly and won his first election in 1932. He was a member of the New York State Assembly from 1933 to 1956.

Congress 
He was elected as a Democrat to the 85th United States Congress and the six succeeding Congresses, holding office from January 3, 1957, to January 3, 1971. In 1966, Farbstein was a senior member of the House Foreign Affairs Committee. He was an open supporter of Lyndon B. Johnson's policy on the Vietnam War. In 1970, he was defeated for re-nomination by Bella Abzug.

Death 
Farbstein died on November 9, 1993, aged 91, in New York City, and was interred in Cedar Park Cemetery in Paramus, New Jersey.

Personal life 
On September 18, 1947, Farbstein married Blossom Langer, and they had one son whom they named after Farbstein's father.

Farbstein was an avid tennis player and golfer. He also enjoyed swimming as a form of exercise.

See also
 List of Jewish members of the United States Congress

References

External links

1902 births
1993 deaths
Jewish American military personnel
United States Coast Guard enlisted
People from Manhattan
Jewish American people in New York (state) politics
Hebrew Union College – Jewish Institute of Religion alumni
City College of New York alumni
New York University School of Law alumni
Democratic Party members of the New York State Assembly
Jewish members of the United States House of Representatives
Democratic Party members of the United States House of Representatives from New York (state)
20th-century American politicians
Burials at Cedar Park Cemetery (Emerson, New Jersey)
United States Coast Guard reservists
20th-century American Jews